Agora is a general name for a public meeting place in ancient Greece.

Agora may also refer to:

Art and entertainment
 Agora (film), a 2009 historical movie about Hypatia of Alexandria
 Agora (sculpture), an art installation by Magdalena Abakanowicz in Chicago's Grant Park
 Agora (Paulinho da Costa album), a 1977 studio jazz album by Paulinho da Costa
 Agora (Fennesz album), a 2019 ambient album by Fennesz
 Agora..., the first studio album by Brazilian musician Ivan Lins (1970)
 "Agora" (song), a song by Bear Hands
 Agora São Paulo or Agora, a Brazilian newspaper started in 1999
 Agora Trilogy, a fantasy novel trilogy by David Whitley set on the world Agora
 Cirkus Agora, a Norwegian travelling circus

Brands and enterprises
 Agora (online marketplace), an online black market
 Agora Financial, a subsidiary of The Agora network that publishes books, magazines, newsletters and financial web sites
 Agora SA, a Polish media corporation
 Agora Super Stores, retail superstore in Bangladesh.
 Agora Theatre and Ballroom, a concert club in Cleveland, Ohio, US
 The Agora, a network of companies in the publishing, information services, and real estate industries

Organizations
 Agora (organization), a Russian human rights advocacy group
 Agora Center, Jyväskylä, Finland
 Agora University, Oradea, Romania

Places
 Agora (Thrace), an ancient Greek town on the Gallipoli peninsula, Turkey
 Ancient Agora of Athens
 L'Àgora, a multifunctional building in Valencia, Spain
 Agora, the building of the Swiss Cancer Centre, Lausanne
 Agora of İzmir

Software
 Agora (programming language)
 Agora (web browser), a proof of concept World Wide Web email browser developed in 1994-1997
 Bing Product Upload, a discontinued part of Microsoft's Bing search engine (codename AGORA)

Other uses
 Israeli agora, a unit of currency
 Agora São Paulo or Agora, a Brazilian newspaper started in 1999
 AGORA (Access to Global Online Research in Agriculture) Program, started by the United Nations Food and Agriculture Organization to provide access to scientific information to developing countries
 Asteroidal Gravity Optical and Radar Analysis (AGORA), a proposed space probe to investigate the asteroid Vesta in the 1990s

See also
 Aghora (disambiguation)
 Agorism, a libertarian political philosophy 
 Agoura, California, an unincorporated area in Los Angeles County